Viram Jasani (born 1945) is a Kenyan-born Indian sitar and tabla composer and musician. He is best known for playing tabla drums on the song "Black Mountain Side" from Led Zeppelin's 1969 debut album. He was awarded an honorary degree from the University of York in March 2007.

Discography
 1972: Ragas: Streams of Light  (with Mrinal Sen Gupta, Lateef Ahmed Khan & Surendra Kamat)
 1995: Rags, Malkauns and Megh  (with Gurdev Singh & Ustad Latif Ahmed Khan)

Notable sessions
 1968: soundtrack (Boom!) by John Barry
 1969: "Black Mountain Side" (Led Zeppelin)
 1971: soundtrack (The Trojan Women) by Mikis Theodorakis
 1972: Dream Sequence by Cosmic Eye
 1973: "Emperor Nero" (The Height Below) by John Williams
 2008: Etudes/Radha Krishna by John Mayer [recorded 1971]

References

External links

 
Asian Music Circuit

1945 births
Living people
Session musicians
Indian drummers
Kenyan emigrants to the United Kingdom
Kenyan people of Indian descent
Musicians from Nairobi
Sitar players
Tabla players
20th-century drummers
20th-century Kenyan musicians
21st-century Kenyan musicians